Nicholas Roosevelt (June 12, 1893 – February 1982) was an American diplomat and journalist. A member of the Roosevelt family and first-cousin once removed of U.S. President Theodore Roosevelt, he was born in New York City to James West Roosevelt, a brother of Hilborne Roosevelt, and Laura Henrietta d'Oremieulx. Brought up in Oyster Bay, New York, he graduated from Harvard University in 1914. He was an attaché at the American Embassy in Paris, secretary to the American mission to Spain in 1916 and 17, vice-governor of the Philippine Islands in 1930, and U.S. minister to Hungary from 1930 to 1933.  He was a member of the Council on Foreign Relations and a writer for its journal Foreign Affairs, and a foreign correspondent and editorial writer for the New York Times and New York Herald Tribune from 1921 to 1946. A prolific author, his autobiography, A Front Row Seat (1953), offers a critical view of Franklin D. Roosevelt, a distant cousin, and an inside view of the New York Times. Theodore Roosevelt (1967) drew on Nicholas Roosevelt's unique childhood recollections, his father having been a close friend of Theodore. He was married to Tirzah Gates, the daughter of California State Senator Egbert Gates. Her sister, Dorothy Gates, was the first wife of eminent astrophysicist Fritz Zwicky. He remained lifelong friends with Fritz Zwicky. He lived in Big Sur, California in later life.

Works
The Philippines: A Treasure and a Problem (1926)
The Restless Pacific (1928)
America and England? (1930)
The Townsend Plan: Taxing for Sixty (1936) (with Francis Everett Townsend)
A New Birth of Freedom (1938)
Wanted: Good Neighbors: The Need for Closer Ties with Latin America (1939)
Venezuela's Place in the Sun: Modernizing a Pioneering Country (1940)
A Front Row Seat (1953)
Creative Cooking (1956)
Good Cooking (1959)
Theodore Roosevelt: The Man as I Knew Him (1967)
Conservation: Now or Never (1970)

References

External links

1893 births
1982 deaths
American diplomats
Nicholas Roosevelt (diplomat)
Schuyler family
Harvard University alumni
Writers from New York City
People from Oyster Bay (town), New York